The Old West is a 1952 American Western film directed by George Archainbaud and starring Gene Autry. The film's sets were designed by the art director Charles Clague.

Plot
Doc Lockwood and his gang are trying to take away Gene Autry's contract for supplying horses to the stagecoach line.

Cast
 Gene Autry as Gene Autry 
 Gail Davis as Arlie Williams 
 Lyle Talbot as Doc Lockwood 
 Louis Jean Heydt as Jeff Bleeker 
 House Peters as Parson Jonathan Brooks
 House Peters Jr. as Henchman Mike 
 Dickie Jones as Pinto 
 Kathy Johnson as Judie Bleeker 
 Pat Buttram as Panhandle Gibbs 
 Gertrude Astor as Townswoman
 Buddy Roosevelt as Cowboy

References

Bibliography
 Pitts, Michael R. Western Movies: A Guide to 5,105 Feature Films. McFarland, 2012.

External links
 

1952 films
1952 Western (genre) films
American Western (genre) films
Films directed by George Archainbaud
Columbia Pictures films
American black-and-white films
1950s English-language films
1950s American films